George Everett Boysen (March 15, 1890 – March 22, 1967) was a Michigan politician.  He was employed for 24 years with the Buick Motor Company. He was a member of the Freemasons and Benevolent and Protective Order of Elks.

Early life
Boysen was born to Charles and Caroline Boysen on March 15, 1890, in Port Clinton, Ottawa County, Ohio. On June 18, 1913, he married Kathryn Wadsworth.

Political life
In 1932 Boysen ran in the Republican primary for U.S. Representative from Michigan 6th District and again in 1936.  The Flint City Commission select him as mayor in 1935 for a single year. In 1938 he was a candidate for Michigan state senate 13th District.

References

1890 births
1967 deaths
American Freemasons
Mayors of Flint, Michigan
Michigan Republicans
20th-century American politicians
People from Port Clinton, Ohio